Mandup Bhutia (born 25 December 1994) is an Indian cricketer. He made his List A debut for Sikkim in the 2018–19 Vijay Hazare Trophy on 20 September 2018. He was the leading wicket-taker for Sikkim in the 2018–19 Vijay Hazare Trophy, with five dismissals in seven matches. He made his first-class debut for Sikkim in the 2018–19 Ranji Trophy on 6 December 2018. He made his Twenty20 debut for Sikkim in the 2018–19 Syed Mushtaq Ali Trophy on 22 February 2019.

References

External links
 

1994 births
Living people
Indian cricketers
Sikkim cricketers
Place of birth missing (living people)